Conatrullus  is a genus of cricket in family Gryllidae.

Taxonomy
Genus contains the following species:
Conatrullus andreji Gorochov, 2001

References

Gryllinae
Orthoptera genera